Abena Osei-Asare (born 16 January 1979) is a Chartered Accountant, Ghanaian politician and currently a Member of Parliament for Atiwa East (Ghana parliament constituency) in the Eastern Region of Ghana.

She is married with three children; two boys and a girl.

Early life and education
Abena Osei Asare attended Achimota Primary School and continue her secondary education at Wesley Girls High School-Cape-Coast (1995–97) where she read General Arts with elective subjects as Economics, Geography and Elective Mathematics.

She later acquired her tertiary education from the University of Ghana, where she studied Economics and Geography. She holds a B.A. (Hons.) in Economics with Geography from the University of Ghana and an Msc. Development Finance from the University of Ghana Business School.

She became a member of the Association of Chartered Certified Accountants (UK) in 2009 and later a fellow in 2014. Also, her membership extends to the Institute of Chartered Accountants (ICA) Ghana.

She also has a certificate in Dealing from ACI (Financial Markets Association).

Career
Abena Osei-Asare graduating after her first degree, did her national service at the President's Special Initiative on Textiles and Garments under President John Agyekum Kufour.

She proceeded to work as the assistant director in Facilities and Finance for the New York University in Ghana between the period of (2004 and 2007).

Continuing her career at Absa Bank [then Barclays Bank Ghana], she served as the customer team leader in the retail department (2007-2009) and dealer for the Treasury Department (2009–12).

In the year 2000 she became a member of the New Patriotic Party and it was on the ticket of this political party that she had contested for the Member of Parliament of the then newly created constituency Atiwa East (Eastern Region) during the 2012 parliamentary elections.

Politics 
Abena contested and won the New Patriotic Party parliamentary seat for Atiwa East Constituency in the Eastern Region of Ghana in 2012. She won the seat again during the 2016 Ghanaian general elections. She contested against one other candidate namely, Asante Foster of the National Democratic Congress .

Abena won the election by obtaining 17,399 votes of the 22,486 cast, representing 77.81 percent of total valid votes.

As a Member of Parliament, she actively participated in the business of parliament as a representative of the people of Atiwa East. She served on the Finance Committee, Public Accounts Committee, and Employment and Social Welfare and State Enterprises Committee in Parliament and has played a key role in passing legislation and agreements as well as interrogating auditees on the Annual Auditor General's Report. Again she was also a board member of the Prestigious Parliamentary Service Board(PSB).

In 2017, at age 38, Abena was the youngest woman ever to be appointed to the Ministry of Finance and Economic Planning as a deputy minister.

At the Ministry of Finance, her schedule included acting as intermediary between the Ministry and Parliament in terms of loan agreements, bills and annual National budget. As the Deputy Minister in charge of budget, she, acting under the Minister of Finance, supported in the smooth preparation and implementation of the government budget for the last 4 years. She was instrumental resolving a lot of the labour union issues under the first four years of H.E. Nana Addo Dankwa Akufo-Addo.

She has also represented the Minister at various international conferences including the UN meetings on SDGs and ILO on labour issues. In terms of Corporate Governance, She represented the Ministry of Finance as a Director on the following boards; ADB BANK, SSNIT, NHIA and GIADEC .

Personal life
Abena is a Christian who fellowships at the Presbyterian church. She is married with three children. She also runs an NGO, The Waterbrook Foundation which supports brilliant but needy students with their Education.

See also
 MPs elected in the Ghanaian parliamentary election, 2012
 New Patriotic Party

References

External links and sources
 Facebook page

Living people
1979 births
University of Ghana alumni
New Patriotic Party politicians
21st-century Ghanaian women politicians
Ghanaian MPs 2017–2021
Women members of the Parliament of Ghana
People educated at Wesley Girls' Senior High School
Ghanaian MPs 2021–2025